Bornel—Belle-Église station (French: Gare de Bornel—Belle-Église) is a rail station located in the commune of Bornel (Oise department), France and serves nearby Belle-Église.  It is served by TER Hauts-de-France trains from Paris-Nord to Beauvais.

See also 
 List of SNCF stations in Hauts-de-France

Gallery

References

Railway stations in Oise